Winston Harvey Price (1923 – April 30, 1981) was an American scientist and professor of epidemiology with a special interest in infectious diseases, who made media headlines in 1957, when he reported details of a vaccine for the common cold after isolating the first rhinovirus. He was acknowledged by the director of the Public Health Research Institute at the time. However, other specialists in the field of vaccine research have disputed his methods and data. 

Earlier in his career, he had detailed how ticks of the genus Dermacentor were the main vectors of Rickettsia rickettsii that caused Rocky mountain spotted fever in humans.

Early life and education 
Price was born in New York City in 1923. He had one older brother, Ira, and his father was a wealthy physician. According to the 1925 New York State Census, his mother was Canadian-born Florence, who had emigrated to the United States. His family lived at 1565 Grand Concourse in the Bronx.

In 1942 he earned a B.A. in biology and chemistry from the University of Pennsylvania and in 1949, M.S. and Ph.D. degrees in physiology and biochemistry from Princeton. He was inspired by Sinclair Lewis's novel Arrowsmith.

Career 
During the Second World War, Price served in the armed forces as a research worker in a laboratory, helping treat injuries from poisonous gases and burns. After the war he was on staff at the Rockefeller Institute for Medical Research.
 
In 1951, he became an assistant professor of biochemistry and a research associate in epidemiology at Johns Hopkins University. The following year, he published his paper on bacterial viruses.

Rocky Mountain spotted fever

In 1954, he detailed how ticks of the genus Dermacentor, not haemaphysalis, were the main vectors of Rickettsia rickettsii that caused Rocky mountain spotted fever in humans.

He co-authored a paper that reported that Rickettsia rickettsii could be made avirulent by treatment with PABA.

Common cold
In 1953, when a cluster of nurses developed a mild respiratory illness, Price took nasal passage samples and isolated the first rhinovirus, which he called the JH virus, named after Johns Hopkins. At the time, the JH virus was the cause of almost one third of cases of the common cold. His findings were published in 1956. According to paediatrician Paul Offit, in his book Vaccinated; One man's quest to defeat the world's deadliest diseases, Price subsequently cultured the virus in the kidney cells of monkeys, added formaldehyde to kill the virus, and then administered it by injection into a hundred local school boys. Over the following two years, he reported that his vaccine reduced the likelihood of catching the common cold by eight-fold. Price did however clarify that "it's absolutely misleading if anyone thinks we are going to have an all-inclusive cure for colds". His findings were published in 1957. It triggered widespread media attention and was acknowledged by virologist George Hirst, who was director of the Public Health Research Institute at the time when he said “the work by Dr. Price on the new JH virus is a promising lead in the attack on the common cold.” Price featured in Life magazine, The Times, The New York Times and Time. However, Price's own supervisor at Johns Hopkins doubted his results. In Offit's book, Maurice Hilleman in the early 1960s, who later became an expert in vaccine research, is said to have disputed Price's data as untrue and saying that "his study was a complete fraud". In Cathy Curtis's biography of Price's second wife, Grace Hartigan, she says that Price was "deceptive", "known for his tall tales" and likely "fabricated" his results. Journalist and author Susannah Cahalan, portrayed Price as "obsessed with finding a cure for the common cold". Price also believed that most people naturally harbored microbes and that environmental factors such as cold weather triggered them to cause illness.

Other work
At one time, the Department of Defense asked Price to study typhus in the armed forces.

While at Johns Hopkins, Price researched the development of resistance against the Japanese encephalitis (JE) virus in mice and monkeys.

With his group at the Johns Hopkins, Price, injected three virus strains, two of which originated from encephalitis viruses, into monkeys, and reported that this conferred protection against "a whole family of diseases". The New York Times in 1964, reported that Price's work may one day lead to a safe vaccine for encephalitis.

Awards 
In 1954, for his work on Rocky Mountain spotted fever and other rickettsial diseases, he received the Theobald Smith Award. In 1963, he received the Howard Taylor Ricketts Award.

Personal life 
His first marriage ended in divorce. As an art collector he met artist Grace Hartigan and they married in 1960; his second marriage and her fourth. In the mid-1960s, he began to self-administer experimental encephalitis vaccines, which led to "impaired judgment, inappropriate responses, memory loss, anxiety and personality changes".

Death 
On April 30, 1981, at the age of 58, Price died of meningitis at the Mercy Hospital, Baltimore, Maryland, following a decade-long mental and physical decline, caused by injecting himself with an experimental vaccine against encephalitis.

Selected publications

References

Further reading
 
The Armed Forces Epidemiological Board. The Histories of the Commissions. Defense Technical Information Center (1992)

1923 births
1981 deaths
Vaccinologists
American epidemiologists
American immunologists
American virologists
Scientists from New York City
Princeton University alumni
University of Pennsylvania alumni
Johns Hopkins University faculty
American military personnel of World War II